Haliabad may refer to:
 Haliabad, Kurdistan